This page lists the main power stations in Guinea contributing to the public power supply.

There are also a number of private power plants supplying specific industrial users such as mines and refineries.

Guinea is considered to have considerable renewable energy potential. Schemes at an advanced state of development are included.

Country Priority Plan and Diagnostic of the Electricity Sector, published in November 2021 by the African Development Bank [AfDB], heavily informs this article.

Hydroelectric

Solar 
A solar facility is proposed at Khoumagueli with 40MW of capacity.

Thermal

Sea waves

See also

 List of power stations in Africa
 List of largest power stations in the world
 Energy in Guinea

References

External links
  Abu Dhabi Government Grants Guinea Dh330.57 Million (US$90 Million) To Fund Three Power Stations.....
 Working to Provide Water and Electricity For All

Guinea
Power stations